Chicago Winds... The Saga Continues is a studio album by American singer Dave Hollister. It was released by eOne Music on October 21, 2014 in the United States.

Critical reception

Allmusic editor Andy Kellman found that Chicago Winds... The Saga Continues is "a solid and consistent release that shows Hollister in top form, singing about relatable, common-man issues with the same level of conviction heard in his best work. No less than half of the songs can contend with the career highlights selected for his 20th Century Masters compilation, and though some longtime fans may miss the streetwise swagger of the earlier work, they can at least respect that Hollister has matured, remains an excellent singer, and isn't trying to be anyone but himself."

Track listing

Charts

References

2014 albums
Dave Hollister albums